Aleksandar Hemon (born September 9, 1964) is a Bosnian-American author, essayist, critic, television writer, and screenwriter. He is best known for the novels Nowhere Man (2002) and The Lazarus Project (2008), and his scriptwriting as a co-writer of The Matrix Resurrections (2021).

He frequently publishes in The New Yorker and has also written for Esquire, The Paris Review, the Op-Ed page of The New York Times, and the Sarajevo magazine BH Dani.

Hemon is also a musician, distributing his Electronica work under the pseudonym "Cielo Hemon."

Early life
Hemon was born in Sarajevo, Bosnia and Herzegovina, then Yugoslavia, to a father of partial Ukrainian descent and a Bosnian Serb mother. Hemon's great-grandfather, Teodor Hemon, came to Bosnia from Western Ukraine prior to World War I, when both countries were a part of the Austro-Hungarian Empire.

Biography
Hemon graduated from the University of Sarajevo and was a published writer in former Yugoslavia by the time he was 26.

Since 1992 he has lived in the United States, where he found himself as a tourist and became stranded at the outbreak of the war in Bosnia.  In the U.S. he worked as a Greenpeace canvasser, sandwich assembly-line worker, bike messenger, graduate student in English literature, bookstore salesperson, and ESL teacher. He earned his master's degree from Northwestern University in 1996.

He is the winner of a MacArthur Foundation grant.

He published his first story in English, "The Life and Work of Alphonse Kauders" in Triquarterly in 1995, followed by "The Sorge Spy Ring," also in Triquarterly in 1996, "A Coin" in Chicago Review in 1997, "Islands" in Ploughshares in 1998, and eventually "Blind Jozef Pronek" in The New Yorker in 1999. His work also eventually appeared in  Esquire, The Paris Review, Best American Short Stories, and elsewhere. Hemon also has a bi-weekly column, written and published in Bosnian, called "Hemonwood" in the Sarajevo-based magazine, BH Dani (BH Days).

Hemon is currently a professor of creative writing at Princeton University, where he lives with his second wife, Teri Boyd, and their daughters Ella and Esther. The couple's second child, 1-year-old daughter Isabel, died of complications associated with a brain tumor in November 2010.  Hemon published an essay, "The Aquarium," about Isabel's death in the June 13/20, 2011 issue of The New Yorker.

Hemon grew up near the Grbavica Stadium, and he is a supporter of the Željo, as the Sarajevo based football club FK Željezničar is affectionately called, with a membership. He is also a supporter of Liverpool Football Club.

Works
In 2000 Hemon published his first book, The Question of Bruno, which included short stories and a novella.

His second book, Nowhere Man, followed in 2002. Variously referred to as a novel and as a collection of linked stories, Nowhere Man concerns Jozef Pronek, a character who earlier appeared in one of the stories in The Question of Bruno. It was a finalist for the 2002 National Book Critics Circle Award.

In June 2006, "Exchange of Pleasant Words" and "A Coin" was published by Picador.

On 1 May 2008, Hemon released The Lazarus Project, inspired by the story of Lazarus Averbuch, which featured photographs by Hemon's childhood friend, photographer Velibor Božović. The novel was a finalist for the 2008 National Book Award, the 2008 National Book Critics Circle Award, and was named as a "New York Times Notable Book" and New York magazine's No. 1 Book of the Year.

In May 2009, Hemon released a collection of stories, Love and Obstacles, which were largely written at the same time as he wrote The Lazarus Project.

In 2011, Hemon was awarded the PEN/W.G. Sebald Award chosen by the judges Jill Ciment, Salvatore Scibona, and Gary Shteyngart.

Hemon's first nonfiction book, The Book of My Lives, was released in 2013.

Hemon's novel The Making of Zombie Wars was released in 2015.

He published his second work of non-fiction, My Parents: An Introduction, in 2019.

On August 20, 2019, it was announced that Hemon would co-write the script for The Matrix Resurrections alongside David Mitchell and Lana Wachowski. The film was released on December 22, 2021.

His latest novel The World and All That it Holds was published on February 2, 2023.

Articles

In October 2019, Hemon joined many intellectuals in an international public outcry in response to the decision of the Nobel Committee to award Peter Handke a Nobel Prize in literature earlier that month (citing Handke's support of the late Slobodan Milošević and Bosnian genocide denial). Hemon wrote an opinion piece in The New York Times, published in the October 15 issue, criticizing the Nobel committee for its decision.

TV and film
While in the United States, Aleksandar Hemon started working as a screenwriter, and collaborated with Lana Wachowski (the Wachowskis) and David Mitchell as co-writer on the finale of the TV show Sense8 and the film The Matrix Resurrections.

Critical reception
As an accomplished fiction writer who learned English as an adult, Hemon has some similarities to Joseph Conrad, which he acknowledges through allusion in The Question of Bruno, though he is most frequently compared to Vladimir Nabokov. All of his stories deal in some way with the Yugoslav Wars, Bosnia, or Chicago, but they vary substantially in genre.

Awards
2017 PEN America Jean Stein Grant For Literary Oral History, for How Did You Get Here?: Tales of Displacement 
2013 National Book Critics Circle Award (Autobiography) shortlist for The Book of My Lives
2012 United States Artists Fellow Award.
2012 National Magazine Award for Essay and Criticism, for "The Aquarium"
2011 PEN/W.G. Sebald Award
2011 Premio Gregor von Rezzori for foreign fiction translated into Italian for The Lazarus Project (Il Progetto Lazarus), translated by Maurizia Balmelli (Einaudi)
2009 National Magazine Award for Fiction, for The New Yorker
2009 St. Francis College Literary Prize 
2008 National Book Award, finalist, for The Lazarus Project
2008 National Book Critics Circle Award, finalist, for The Lazarus Project
2004 MacArthur Fellows Program from the MacArthur Foundation
2003 Guggenheim Fellowship
2003 National Book Critics Circle Award, finalist, for Nowhere Man
2001 John C. Zacharis First Book Award, for The Question of Bruno

Bibliography 
Short fiction
"The Liar," collected in The Book of Other People (Zadie Smith, editor)
"The Conductor," collected in The Best American Short Stories 2006 (Ann Patchett, editor); first published in The New Yorker, February 28, 2005

Articles

Essays
 2014 "The Matters of Life, Death, and More: Writing on Soccer", 
 2015 "My Prisoner", 

Novels
2002 Nowhere Man, 
2008 The Lazarus Project, 
2015 The Making of Zombie Wars, 

Short story collections
2000 The Question of Bruno, 
2009 Love and Obstacles. Riverhead Books, .Nonfiction
2013 The Book of My Lives, 
2019 My Parents: An Introduction / This Does Not Belong to You, .

Editor
2010 Best European Fiction 20102010 Best European Fiction 20112011 Best European Fiction 20122012 Best European Fiction 2013References

External links
 Official website
 Hemon's page on U.S. publisher's website Riverhead Books
 Hemon, Aleksandar. "The Noble Truths of Suffering" National Magazine Award-winning New Yorker story
 Hemon, Aleksandar "Genocide’s Epic Hero" New York Times Op-Ed on Radovan Karadžić
 Hemon, Aleksandar 'The Bob Dylan of genocide apologists' New York Times'' Op-Ed on Peter Handke
 Hemon, Aleksandar "Rationed"
 Hemon, Aleksander The Tenants: An Introduction – Hemon provided the Introduction to the 2003 reissue of Bernard Malamud's 1971 novel The Tenants.
 Portrait by Graphic Journalism]
"National Subjects" in Guernica, January 2012
 2008 Bomb Magazine interview of Aleksandar Hemon by Deborah Baker
 Cielo Hemon on Bandcamp

1964 births
Living people
21st-century American novelists
American columnists
American male novelists
Bosnia and Herzegovina emigrants to the United States
Bosnia and Herzegovina novelists
Bosnia and Herzegovina short story writers
Exophonic writers
MacArthur Fellows
Writers from Sarajevo
University of Sarajevo alumni
Northwestern University alumni
Northwestern University faculty
Writers from Chicago
St. Francis College Literary Prize
American male short story writers
21st-century American short story writers
21st-century American male writers
Novelists from Illinois
21st-century American non-fiction writers
American male non-fiction writers